For Love or Money (also released as The Concierge) is a 1993 American romantic comedy film directed by Barry Sonnenfeld and starring Michael J. Fox and Gabrielle Anwar.

Plot
Doug Ireland is a concierge at the Bradbury, a luxurious hotel in New York City. Doug is very well-connected and is very good at his job, giving personal attention to guests like Gene Salvatore while occasionally pocketing a big tip. He also helps people who don’t tip as well, such as Harry Wegman. Doug's dream is to open his own hotel on Roosevelt Island. He has saved every cent and obtained an option on an old hotel.  But he only has a few weeks to begin development and needs at least $3 million immediately to start or the development goes back to the city.

Doug's best chance is Christian Hanover, a somewhat unscrupulous billionaire. Christian considers the proposal and asks Doug to "take care" of his mistress, Andy Hart, a perfume saleswoman. Christian has been leading Andy on, making her believe that he was divorcing his wife. Doug had been flirting with Andy before he knew she was seeing Christian, and had asked her out multiple times. However, she always stated that she had a boyfriend. Doug spends time with Andy when Christian neglects her, (as a “favor” for Christian) and he saves Andy and Christian from an embarrassing scene at a party in Christian's house with his wife, Elenor.

Doug learns that Christian is deceiving Andy about getting a divorce, stating, “you don’t divorce your third wife”. But because his hotel proposal is urgent and Andy is old enough to make her own decisions, he doesn't intervene. However, as he and Andy spend time together, he develops feelings for her, going to an elegant restaurant with her after Christian is late due to a date with his wife. He simultaneously helps Wegman with his failing marriage, helping him get his wife to love him again.

Andy learns that a document Christian has asked Doug to sign was intended to permit the billionaire to take over the hotel project and force Doug out. Christian reveals that an IRS agent who was tailing Doug about the real estate property he (Doug) bought until he (Christian) and his lawyers took care of it was actually working with Christian to get the property. Christian smugly tells Andy that the project was going to make a fortune and he wasn't going to share it with a mere concierge. Andy abandons him to warn Doug, who is chasing after her to tell her Christian isn’t divorcing his wife.  After the two reunite at the Queensboro Bridge and reveal to each other about the deception, Doug says he never signed the document due to leaving to warn Andy, so Christian can't take over the property.

In the end, after Doug and Andy marry, he gets a call from Wegman, who despite his frugalness is a successful financier, has accidentally been sent Doug's business plan by a senile member of the hotel staff Doug refused to fire and has decided to put up the $3 million that Doug needs.

Main cast

 Michael J. Fox as  Doug Ireland
 Gabrielle Anwar as  Andy Hart
 Anthony Higgins as Christian Hanover
 Bob Balaban as Ed Drinkwater
 Michael Tucker as Mr. Harry Wegman
 Fyvush Finkel  as Milton Glickman
 Dan Hedaya as Gene Salvatore
 Isaac Mizrahi as Julian Russell
 Goodfella Mike G. (as Mike G.) as Charlie the Doorman
 Saverio Guerra as  Carmen
 Daniel Hagen as Vincent, Bartender
 La Chanze as Nora
 Paula Laurence as  Mrs. Jeanette Vigusian
 Donna Mitchell as Eleanor Hanover
 Debra Monk as  Mrs. Wegman
 Harry Bugin as Joey Pickles
 Udo Kier as Mr. Himmelman

Reception
On Rotten Tomatoes the film has an approval rating of 37% based on reviews from 19 critics.

Roger Ebert of The Chicago Sun-Times awarded the film a two out of four stars and described the film as "the kind of movie where you walk in, sit down, and start thinking this is where you came in." Gene Siskel of The Chicago Tribune awarded the film a two and a half out of four stars and stated that the film was "a solid setup for a good story, but For Love or Money doesn't have one to tell."

It was not a commercial success domestically in North America, earning less than half its production budget before being withdrawn from theatres after just four weeks of release.

References

External links
 
 
 
 Review of film at The New York Times

1993 films
1993 romantic comedy films
Films directed by Barry Sonnenfeld
Films set in New York City
Imagine Entertainment films
Universal Pictures films
Films produced by Brian Grazer
Films set in hotels
Films scored by Bruce Broughton
American romantic comedy films
1990s English-language films
1990s American films